"If I Ruled the World" is a popular song, composed by Leslie Bricusse and Cyril Ornadel, which was originally from the 1963 West End musical Pickwick (based on Charles Dickens's The Pickwick Papers).

Background
In the context of the stage musical, the song is sung by Samuel Pickwick, when he is mistaken for an election candidate and called on by the crowd to give his manifesto.  Ornadel and Bricusse received the 1963 Ivor Novello award for Best Song Musically and Lyrically.

First recordings
The song is usually associated with Sir Harry Secombe, who got the song to No 18 in the UK charts in 1963. 
Tony Bennett originally recorded the song in 1965, and had a number 34 hit with it on the U.S. pop singles charts and number 8 on the Middle-Road Singles chart.  In a duet with Celine Dion, he returned to the song on his Grammy-winning 2006 album Duets: An American Classic.

Other recordings
It has been performed by other singers, notably:
Nancy Wilson 
Robert Goulet
James Brown
Stevie Wonder
The Supremes
Tom Jones
Regina Belle
Jamie Cullum also recorded a version for his album The Pursuit, and performed it at his special performance at the Late Night Prom, number Prom 55, of The Proms in London, with The Heritage Ensemble, on Thursday 26 August 2010 between 22:15 and 13.45. As shown on BBC televisions' BBC Four on the following night.

Popular culture
The song was featured in Bruce Almighty by Tom Shadyac (2003).
The song was featured in the movie, War of the Worlds  by Steven Spielberg (2005).
This song was featured in Spring/Summer 2009 on the Vodafone adverts in the UK.
This song was featured in the 2014 Korean film, Night Flight, directed by Lee Song Hee-il.
The politician-spoofing BBC panel show If I Ruled the World was named after the song.
Andy Hallett, the actor best known for playing the part of Lorne ('The Host') in the television series Angel, sang the song in that series' final episode.

References

External links
Cyril Ornadel
Lyrics

1963 songs
1965 singles
Songs from musicals
Tony Bennett songs
James Brown songs
Nancy Wilson (jazz singer) songs
Songs written by Leslie Bricusse
Works based on The Pickwick Papers
Songs written by Cyril Ornadel